Jarico Joseph O'Quinn (born April 22, 1995) is an American professional boxer competing in the Bantamweight division.

Boxing career

Amateur career
O'Quinn won the USA National Championship at bantamweight in 2014 in Spokane, Washington. He also won the 2013 USA Boxing Youth National Championship.

Early professional career
O'Quinn made his professional debut against Hoy Mack on April 10, 2015. He won the fight by a first-round retirement. He amassed a 12-0-1 record over the course of the next four years, with eight stoppage victories, before being scheduled to face James Smith for the vacant WBO International super flyweight title on October 5, 2019, at the Dort Federal Credit Union Event Center in Flint, Michigan. O'Quinn won the fight by unanimous decision, with all three judges awarding him a 96-93 scorecard.

O'Quinn was scheduled to face Oscar Vasquez at the WinnaVegas Casino & Resort in Sloan, Iowa on January 17, 2020. He won the fight by unanimous decision, with all three judges scoring the fight 79-73 in his favor.

O'Quinn was scheduled to face Saul Sanchez in the main event of the three-fight "ShoBox: The New Generation" card. The card was scheduled for September 24, 2021 at the Central Park Community Center in Broken Arrow, Oklahoma. He lost the fight by a first-round technical knockout. O'Quinn was knocked down three times in under two minutes, which prompted referee Gary Ritter to stop the fight.

O'Quinn is scheduled to face Jobert Alvarez on the undercard of a UFC Fight Pass broadcast event on April 15, 2022. He won the fight by unanimous decision, with all three judges scoring the bout 80–72 in his favor.

Boxing record

References

External links
 
 

Winners of the United States Championship for amateur boxers
Boxers from Detroit
Bantamweight boxers
1995 births
Living people
American male boxers